Taft is an English surname. Notable people with the surname include:

 William Howard Taft (1857–1930), 27th president of the United States and 10th Chief Justice of the United States
The Taft family, a political dynasty that includes the above-named president:
 The Tafts of Mendon and Uxbridge, Massachusetts:
 Robert Taft Sr. (c. 1640–1725), immigrant, patriarch of the Taft family, and ancestor of President Taft
 Robert Taft, 2nd (1674–1748), colonial-born pioneer son of Robert Taft Sr., he founded the Tafts of Ohio
 Josiah Taft (1709–1756), grandson of Robert Sr and husband of Lydia Chapin Taft
 Lydia Chapin Taft (1712–1778), widow of Josiah and the first woman to vote in colonial America
 Peter Rawson Taft (1785–1867), descendant of Robert Sr, grandfather of President Taft, and a Vermont legislator
 The Tafts of Ohio:
Alphonso Taft (1810–1891), Attorney General and Secretary of War of the United States, co-founder of Skull and Bones, descendant of Robert Sr, and father of President Taft
Louise Taft (1827–1907), second wife of Alphonse and mother of the president
Henry Waters Taft (1859–1945), American lawyer and brother of the president
Charles Phelps Taft (1843–1929), American lawyer and brother of the president
Horace Dutton Taft (1861–1943), American educator and brother of the president
Robert A. Taft (1889–1953), United States senator from Ohio, son of the president
Robert Taft Jr. (1917–1993), Robert A. Taft's son, 1960s U.S. representative and 1970s U.S. Senator from Ohio
Bob Taft (born 1942), Robert A. Taft's grandson, a governor of Ohio
Bill Taft, American rock musician
Catherine Taft, American art critic
Earl Taft (1931–2021), American mathematician, husband of Hessy
George Taft (born 1993), English footballer
Hessy Levinsons Taft (born 1934), Jewish child model for Nazi propaganda, wife of Earl
Lorado Taft (1860–1936), American sculptor
Kevin Taft (born 1955), Canadian politician
Robert F. Taft (1932–2018), a Jesuit priest
Jerry Taft (1943–2020), American meteorologist

See also
Justice Taft (disambiguation)

English-language surnames